(born March 15, 1966 in Kanagawa) is a retired boxer from Japan, who competed for his native country at the 1992 Summer Olympics in Barcelona, Spain.

Japan sent four boxers to the Barcelona Olympic Games. Nagashima competed in the Men's Light-Middleweight (– 71 kg) division. He was defeated in the first round by Maselino Masoe of American Samoa after the referee stopped the contest due to injury.

References
Profile

1966 births
Living people
Sportspeople from Kanagawa Prefecture
Light-middleweight boxers
Boxers at the 1992 Summer Olympics
Olympic boxers of Japan
Japanese male boxers
20th-century Japanese people